The 116th United States Congress began on January 3, 2019. There were nine new senators (two Democrats, seven Republicans) and a minimum of 89 new representatives (59 Democrats, 29 Republicans, with one open seat pending), as well as one new delegate (a Democrat), at the start of its first session. Additionally, three senators (one Democrat, two Republicans) and eight representatives (two Democrats, six Republicans) took office on various dates in order to fill vacancies during the 117th Congress before it ended on January 3, 2021.

The co-presidents of the House Democratic freshman class were Colin Allred of Texas and Haley Stevens of Michigan, while the president of the House Republican freshman class was Mark E. Green of Tennessee. Additionally, the Democratic Freshmen Leadership Representatives were Katie Hill of California and Joe Neguse of Colorado, and the Republican's freshmen liaison was Guy Reschenthaler of Pennsylvania. Veronica Escobar of Texas replaced Hill upon her resignation in November 2019.

Senate

Took office January 3, 2019

Took office during the 116th Congress

House of Representatives

Took office January 3, 2019

Non-voting members

Took office during the 116th Congress

See also 
 List of United States senators in the 116th Congress
 List of members of the United States House of Representatives in the 116th Congress by seniority

Notes

References

Freshman class members
116